Nicias is a genus of beetles in the family Cerambycidae. It is monotypic, being represented by the single species Nicias alurnoides. Other species formerly placed in the genus Nicias are now classified in the genus Oideterus.

References

Prioninae